Louise (Take 2) is a 1998 French drama film directed by Siegfried. It was screened in the Un Certain Regard section at the 1998 Cannes Film Festival.

Cast
 Élodie Bouchez - Louise
 Roschdy Zem - Rémi
 Gérald Thomassin - Yaya
 Antoine du Merle - Gaby
 Bruce Myers - The Hobo
 Naguime Bendidi - Bestopaz
 Abdel Houari - Selem
 Lou Castel - Louise's Father
 Véronique Octon - Leila
 Yvette Jean - Maman Yvette
 Johanna Mergirie - Johanna
 Véra Briole - Social worker
 Philippe Ambrosini - Police inspector
 Nozha Khouadra - Shop attendant
 Patrick Lizana - Pharmacist
 Tonio Descanvelle - Waiter at Luxembourg
 Eriq Ebouaney

References

External links

1998 films
1990s French-language films
1998 drama films
French drama films
1990s French films